Jolley is a surname, also spelt Jolleys and Jolly.

It may refer to:

Jolley
 Al Jolley, American football player and coach
 Ben Jolley (born 1986), Australian footballer
 Christian Jolley (born 1988), English footballer
 Clark Jolley, American politician
 Dan Jolley, American author
 Doug Jolley (born 1979), American football player
 Edward Jolley (1874–1915), Australian politician
 Elizabeth Jolley (1923–2007), Australian writer
 Gordon Jolley (born 1949), American football player
 Gwilt Jolley (1859–1916), English painter
 I. Stanford Jolley (1900–1978), American actor
 James Jolley (1813–1892), Scots Canadian saddler and politician
 Jim Jolley, English rugby league footballer who played in the 1900s and 1910s, and coached in the 1900s and 1910s
 John L. Jolley (1840–1926), American politician
 Judy Mohraz née Jolley (born 1943), American CEO, philanthropist, and president of Goucher College
 LeRoy Jolley (born 1937), American racehorse trainer
 Lewis Jolley (born 1949), American football running back
 Moody Jolley  (1910–1976), American racehorse breeder and trainer
 Michael Jolley, English football coach
 Rashida Jolley, American harpist
 Shane Jolley, Canadian politician
 Smead Jolley (1902–1991), American baseball player
 Stan Jolley (born 1926), American art director
 Steve Jolley (born 1975), American soccer player
 Steven Jolley (born 1950), half of Jolley & Swain, a British songwriting duo
 Teddy Jolley (1871–1895), English footballer
 William Jolley (1923–1995), English cricketer
 William Jolley (architect) (1836–1919), English architect

Jolly
 Alan Jolly (1910–1977), British military officer
 Alexander Jolly (1756–1838), Scottish bishop
 Alison Jolly (1937–2014), American primatologist
 Allison Jolly (born 1956), American sailor
 Arthur M. Jolly (born 1969), American writer
 Cathy Jolly (born 1972), American politician from Missouri
 Courtney Jolly (born 1986), American monster truck driver
 Darren Jolly (born 1981), Australian footballer
 Dave Jolly (1924–1963), American baseball player
 David Jolly (born 1972), American politician
 E. Grady Jolly (born 1937), American judge
 Friedrich Jolly (1844–1904), German neurologist and psychiatrist
 George Jolly (1640–1673), English actor, impresario
 Gordon Jolly, New Zealand lawn bowler
 Hayden Jolly (born 1992), Australian footballer
 Hi Jolly (1828–1902), Jordanian camel driver
 J. G. Jolly (born 1926), Indian physician
 John Jolly, American Cherokee native
 Johnny Jolly (born 1983), American footballer
 Julius Jolly (Indologist) (1849–1932), German scholar and translator
 Julius Jolly (politician) (1823-1891), German politician
 June Jolly (1928–2016), British nurse
 Justin Marie Jolly (1870–1953), French hematologist
 Kellie Harper née Jolly (born 1977), American basketball player and coach
 Mike Jolly (born 1958), American football player
 Nicci Jolly (born 1981), Scottish television presenter
 Norman Jolly (1882–1954), Australian cricketer and forestry administrator
 Pete Jolly (1932–2004), American jazz pianist
 Philipp von Jolly (1809–1884), German physicist and mathematician
 Richard Jolly (born 1934), British development economist
 Rick Jolly (1946–2018), British naval medical officer
 Rob Jolly (born 1945), Scots-Australian politician
 Sandy Jolly (born 1954), Canadian businesswoman and politician
 Shaun Jolly (born 1998), American football player
 Stephen Jolly (politician), Australian activist and councillor
 Tom Jolly, board game inventor
 Vijay Jolly (born 1960), Indian politician
 Warren Jolly (born 1983), American entrepreneur
 William Jolly (1881–1955), Australian politician

English-language surnames